Allium sphaerocephalon is a plant species in the Amaryllis family known as round-headed leek, round-headed garlic, ball-head onion, and other variations on these names. Drumstick allium is another common name applied to this species. Some publications use the alternate spelling Allium sphaerocephalum. It is a bulbous herbaceous perennial plant.

Allium sphaerocephalon is found in the wild across all parts of Europe except in the northern and western countries ( Scotland, Ireland, Netherlands, Scandinavia, and the Baltic States). Its native range extends to northern Africa and to western Asia as far east as Iran. It is also reportedly naturalised in New York State, US. In England it grows wild only in the Avon Gorge so is known locally as the Bristol onion.

The species is prized by gardeners because of its striking floral display. The spherical "head" (technically an umbel) is borne on a long scape, up to 50 cm in height, usually in July. It can contain hundreds of deep purple flowers.

The specific epithet sphaerocephalon derives from ancient Greek, meaning "spherical head".

This plant has gained the Royal Horticultural Society’s Award of Garden Merit.

Description
Allium sphaerocephalon produces egg-shaped bulbs. Small bulblets are present under the outer layer of the stem (making the plant potentially invasive when grown in gardens). Flowers are borne on a scape up to 50 cm in height, in a spherical to egg-shaped umbel, 1–6 cm in diameter, tightly packed with many flowers crowded together. The relatively small size of the umbel relative to the height of the stem makes this one of those described as 'drumstick alliums'. Individual flowers are reddish-purple and are occasionally replaced by bulbils (again making this a potentially invasive species).

Subspecies and varieties

Allium sphaerocephalon var. aegaeum (Heldr. & Halácsy) Hayek - Aegean Islands
Allium sphaerocephalon subsp. arvense (Guss.) Arcang. - Sicily, Malta, Albania, Greece, Turkey, Cyprus, Syria, Lebanon, Egypt, Algeria, Tunisia, Morocco
Allium sphaerocephalon subsp. laxiflorum (Guss.) Giardina & Raimondo - Sicily
Allium sphaerocephalon subsp. sphaerocephalon - much of Europe plus Morocco, Canary Islands, Middle East
Allium sphaerocephalon subsp. trachypus (Boiss. & Spruner) K.Richt. - Greece and Turkey incl Aegean Islands

Formerly included

 Allium sphaerocephalon subsp. durandoi, now called Allium ebusitanum  
 Allium sphaerocephalon subsp. ebusitanum, now called Allium ebusitanum   
 Allium sphaerocephalon subsp. rollii, now called Allium amethystinum 
 Allium sphaerocephalon subsp. sardoum, now called Allium guttatum subsp. sardoum
 Allium sphaerocephalon var. scaberrimum, now called Allium scaberrimum

References

External links

 
 Comprehensive profile for Allium sphaerocephalon from the website MaltaWildPlants.com

sphaerocephalon
Flora of Europe
Flora of North Africa
Garden plants
Plants described in 1753
Taxa named by Carl Linnaeus